Our Struggles is a 2018 Belgian-French comedy-drama film directed by Guillaume Senez. It was screened in the International Critics' Week section at the 2018 Cannes Film Festival. It received seven nominations at the 9th Magritte Awards and won five (the most for the event), including Best Film and Best Director for Guillaume Senez.

Cast
 Romain Duris as Olivier
 Laure Calamy as Claire
 Lætitia Dosch as Betty
 Lucie Debay as Laura
 Basile Grunberger as Elliot
 Lena Girard Voss as Rose
 Dominique Valadié as Joëlle

Accolades

References

External links
 

2018 films
2018 comedy-drama films
Belgian comedy-drama films
French comedy-drama films
2010s French-language films
Magritte Award winners
French-language Belgian films
2010s French films